Maria Baumgartner (born 13 March 1952 in Königswiesen, Austria) is an Austrian studio potter and was professor of ceramics at the University of Arts and Industrial Design Linz.

Biography 
From 1972 to 1979 Maria Baumgartner studied ceramics at the University of Arts and Industrial Design Linz and graduated as Master of Fine Arts. 1980 she founded her first studio near Lienz/ Tirol and worked there as freelance artist until 2014.
1986 she additionally started working as assistant professor at the University of Arts and Industrial Design Linz and continued her career there as Associate professor until her retirement in 2014. 2015 she founded a new studio in Puchenau near Linz and works also in Tyros, Arcadia, Greece. Besides being artist and professor she also acted as curator and academic author in the field of ceramic art.

Work 
As artist she won awards, prizes and grants in Austria, Germany, Croatia und Hungary. She participated in 32 personal and 121 group exhibitions in Austria, Germany, Switzerland, France, Italy, Belgium, Chechia, Spain, Denmark, Lithuania, Croatia, Latvia, Turkey, Egypt, USA, Korea and Japan. Her artworks can be found in several art museums and other well known public or private art collections, like the Museum of Applied Arts, Vienna, the Museum of Design, Zürich, Sèvres – Cité de la céramique, France, the Igal & Diane Silber Collection, Laguna Beach/ Cal., the Panevėžys Civic Art Gallery (Lithuania), the International Ceramics Studio in Kecskemét (Hungary), the Museum of Modern Ceramic Art, Mino Ceramic Park, Gifu (Japan), the Grassi Museum, Leipzig, or the collection of the Veste Coburg.

Maria Baumgartner herself writes about her recent objects of ceramic art: "My objects are each built up and hand-formed to their individual shape. The surface is smoothed only partially. This free development of the ceramic form can be seen in the sometimes dissolving rims and in the often thin-walled shells of the objects. The forms are inspired by an architectural aesthetic, hinting at vertical axes, playing with orthogonal or other geometric structures, but deconstructing, tilting and intertwining them. Thus a positive disquiet can be experienced. The entire surface of the ceramic objects is worked out in multiple layering by paintbrush, sgraffito or other pictorial techniques. Aim is to reach the impression of »three-dimensional paintings«"

The following pictures show this formative development of the ceramic sculptural objects by Maria Baumgartner: starting from experimenting with circular or cylindrical forms (figure 1), she developed more complicated objects, using thin-walled wavelike shapes with experimental glazes (figure 2), or more solid houselike structures with straight angles (figures 3, 4). Now her objects are a free combination of various geometric shapes and conceptional graphics (figure 5)

Awards, grants, invitations (a selection) 
 1986 Upper Austrian Grant for artistic talent ("Talentförderungsprämie")
 1991 Austrian State Prize for Design ("österr. Staatspreis für gestaltendes Handwerk")
 1993 Nagrada (award) "Slavonski Brod" (= Medal "New Positions"), 4. Svetski Triennale Male Keramike, Zagreb/ Croatia.
 1993, 1998 International Ceramic Symposia, Panevėžys/ LIT (invited artist)
 1994 3rd »Tradition and Possibilities« Symposium: Blue Porcelain Painting Dubí/ Chechia (invited artist), 
 1998 Celadon Porcelain Festival & Symposium, Gangjin/ KOR (group invitation).
 1998 Salzburg Award for Ceramic Art ("Salzburger Keramikpreis").
 1998, 2000 Biennial "Form & Glaze", Frankfurt am Main (Germany) (invited artist by jury decision)
 2002, 2003: Fire Magic II, III Symposia, International Ceramics Studio (ICS), Kecskemét (Hungary) (co-director).
 2020: GRACIS 2020. Zagreb, Zelina award: silver medal.

 Personal exhibitions (a selection) 
 1982 Ceramics, Gallery "Kunsthof Weihergut", Salzburg/ A
 1984 Ceramics and Porcellain, Galerie Thaddaeus Ropac, Lienz/ A
 1990 Maria Baumgarter/ Lilo Schrammel: Ceramics, Gallery (of the artist's association) MAERZ, Linz/ A
 1992 Maria Baumgartner – Ceramics, Gallery in the Museum "Schloss Bruck", Lienz/ A
 1992 Maria Baumgartner: Ceramics, Gallery L in the "Heine-Haus", Hamburg/ BRD
 1993 Vases and Colours, Gallery Felice Figl, Linz/ A
 1996 Landscapes – Pale Clay, Gallery "Ceramic Arts", Vienna/ A
 1996 Works in Clay, Gallery in the "Looshaus", Vienna/ A
 2000 Maria Baumgartner: New Ceramics, Gallery "b15", Munich/ BRD
 2000 Ceramic Objects and Sculptures, Kammerhof Gallery, Gmunden/ A
 2001 Maria Baumgartner: Ceramics, Gallery "Unart", Villach/ A
 2001 Ceramics: Series "Kasbah", "Twists", "Orcas", Gallery "Tiroler Kunstpavillon", Innsbruck/ Aonline via the database "basis Vienna" accessed 28 February 2016.
 2010 A Plentiful Portion – Ceramic Objects, Gallery "Kulturkeller Schloss Dobersberg/ A"
 2015 – 2017 Maria Baumgartner: open gallery exhibition program, Gallery Maria Baumgartner, Puchenau near Linz/ A (organized by "Die Kunstsammlung OÖ./ Upper Austrian Arts Foundation").
 2020 Art cycling in Millstatt, special exhibition Maria Baumgartner in the Millstatt abbey (cloister).

 Group exhibitions (a selection) 
 1981 Austrian Ceramics 1900 – 1980, City Museum "Nordico" Linz, and Museum of Applied Arts, Vienna.
 1984 12 Ceramic Artists from Austria, Gallery Ludwig, Hannover/ BRD.
 1986 European Contemporary Ceramics, Ceramics museum "Keramion", Frechen near Cologne.
 1986 Contemporary Ceramics in Austria, Art Collection of the Veste Coburg/ BRD (and other places).
 1989 L’Europe des Ceramistes. Actualité de la Céramique Européenne, Abbey of Saint-Germain d'Auxerre/ FRA (and other places).
 1991 Ceramics as Passion: the Collection of Prof. Cornelius Ouwehand, Musée Bellerive, Zurich/ CH.
 1992 Le Bol aux quatre coins de la terre, Gallery Leonelli, Lausanne/ CH.
 1992 ALKER (Antiratna likovna keramička radionica) za Dubrovnik i Vukovar, Gradski Muzej Karlovac/ CRO; 
 1993 4th World Triennial Exhibition of Small Ceramics, Meštrović Pavilion, Zagreb/ CRO.
 1994 The 2nd Cairo International Biennale for Ceramics, Zamalek Art Gallery, Cairo/ EGY.
 1996 Ceramics from the 20th Century. Collection Ingrid and Rudolf Welle, City Gallery, Paderborn/ BRD.
 1996 Movement – European Contemporary Ceramics '96, Ceramics museum "Keramion", Frechen near Cologne.
 1998 International Contemporary Ceramics from the Igal and Diane Silber Collection, Laguna Art Museum, Laguna Beach/ Cal.
 2000 The World of Pots. Contemporary Ceramics. Collection Rudolf Strasser, Museum in the "Kreuzgang", Landshut/ BRD (and other places).
 2000, 2001 SOFA Art Fair, New York/ NY & Chicago/ Ill.Also online accessed 1 March 2016. 
 2001 Salon international de céramique de collection et des arts du feu, Hôtel du Rond-point, Paris/ FRA.
 2005 In time. In space. In fire, Museion No. 1, International Ceramics Studio, Budapest/ HUN.
 2007 Modern Ceramics from Central Europe – A Focus on Hungary, the Czech Republic and Greater Central Europe, Museum of Modern Ceramic Art, Gifu/ JAP.
 2012 1000 Gramm/ 1000 grams, Gallery of Applied Arts, Munic/ BRD.
 2014 Ceramics from the 20th Century. Objects from the Donation Welle, Museum of Applied Arts, Gera/ BRD.
 2016 Heritage and Diversity. East and West Invitational Ceramic Exhibition, Hanyang University Museum, Seoul/ KOR.
 2016 Latvia International Ceramics Biennale – Martinsons Award Exhibition, Mark Rothko Art Centre, Daugavpils/ LAT.
 2017 Ceramics out of Passion: Kurt Ohnsorg, Günther Praschak, Maria Baumgartner and others, Lower Austrian Centre of Modern Arts, Sankt Pölten/ AUT. 
 2018, 2020 Art cycling in Millstatt, Millstatt/ AUT
 2019–2020 Paroda Keramiada. Trys Panevėžio tarptautinio keramikos simpoziumo dešimtmečiai/ Three Decades of Panevėžys International Ceramic Symposium, Panevėžio miesto dailės galerija/ Panevėžys Civic Art Gallery, Panevėžys/ LIT
 2020 G.R.A.C.I.S. 2020 (Ceramics from Germany, Romania, Austria, Croatia, Italy, Slovenia), Zvonimir Gallery, Zagreb.
 2020 MIKS 20. Međunarodna izložba keramike i stakla – International exhibition of ceramics and glass, Zagreb, Ambienta fair, Zagreb Fair Grounds.
 2021 Ceramic Diversity, Salzburg, Berchtoldvilla.
 2021–2022 ANALOG – Austrian and International Ceramics from the 1980s, Schrems, Austria, Art museum Waldviertel.
 2022 INDIA FEST 22 – Povodom 73. proslave Dana Republike Indije/ Exhibition on the occasion of the 73rd celebration of the foundation Day of the Republic of India, virtual/ online exhibition with 47 ceramic artists from Austria, Canada, Croatia, Estonia, India, Italy, Romania, Singapore, Slovenia, Turkey, Uruguay and USA, organized by: LADICA Likovni art dizajn centar/ LADICA Fine arts and design center, Zagreb
 2022 ″Lucky sherd″ – Contemporary Ceramics – Collection Rudolf Strasser, Museum of the city of Landshut

 Publications (a selection) 
 Die Österreich-Seite: »Man muss in die Werkstatt gehen«. Über Franz Josef Altenburg (The Austria page: on Franz Josef Altenburg). In: Neue Keramik. vol 3 (1989), no. 5, pp. 583–584.
 Das Europa der Keramiker. Zu einer internationalen Großausstellung der Linzer Kunsthochschule (Ceramists' Europe: On an international exhibition at the Arts University Linz). In: linz aktiv no. 114 (1990), pp. 75–77.
 Keramikerinnen in Salzburg (Female Ceramists in Salzburg). In: Wally, Barbara (ed.): Künstlerinnen in Salzburg (Female Artists in Salzburg). ed. Museum Carolino Augusteum, Salzburg 1991, pp. 83–98.
 Ceramics in Austria – Survival in the Invisible. In: European Ceramic from 13 counties: exhibition catalogue, Kunsthalle Dominikanerkirche Osnabrück. ed Rasch, Bramsche (Germany) 1998, pp. 120–123.
 Neues Feuer. Ein Ausstellungsprojekt der Keramik an der University of Arts and Industrial Design Linz 1999/2000 (New Fire. An exhibition project). ed. University of Arts and Industrial Design Linz, Linz 1999, .
 Indoor – Outdoor. Keramik im Garten. Ein Projekt der Kunstuniversität Linz und der Westungarischen Universität Sopron (Indoor – Outdoor. Ceramics in the garden. A project of the Arts University Linz and the Hungarian University Sopron). ed. University of Arts and Industrial Design Linz, Linz 2003
 Selber Linzer. Eine Ausstellung der Kunstuniversität Linz – Studienrichtung Keramik ("Linzer Oneself": An Exhibition by the University of Arts and Industrial Design Linz  – Institute of Ceramics). ed. Dt. Porzellanmuseum, Selb (Germany) 2006, .
 Kopieren und Einfügen. Eine Ausstellung der Kunstuniversität Linz im Rahmen der OÖ. Landesausstellung 2008 (Copy and Paste. An exhibition of the Arts University Linz within the Upper Austrian Regional Exhibition 2008). ed. University of Arts and Industrial Design Linz, Linz 2008, .

 References 

 External links 

 Entry Maria Baumgartner in the Austrian artist data base of the "Tiroler Künstlerschaft"
 Entry Maria Baumgartner in the international arts data base "artfacts.net"
 Bowl 1981 on the website of "basis Vienna" from the personal exhibition 1982 in Zell am See/AUT;
 Bowl 1983 from the collection of the Academy of Arts (Hochschule der Künste), Zurich/ CH;
 Bowl 1986 from the collection of the "Veste Coburg", Germany (temporarily not reachable);
 Rain Vase 1991 from the collection of the Austrian Federal Government in Vienna;
 Shell 1991 on the website of the Austrian National Library from the solo exhibition in Lienz/AUT
 Patches 1998 from the collection of the "Panevezys Civic Art Gallery" (Lithuania); 
 Composition 2017  from the "Ceramics out of Passion" exhibition 2017 in St. Pölten/AUT;
 Kasbah 2001 in the collection of Sèvres – Cité de la céramique''/ FRA;
 Bend no. 1 2003 from the "Art cycling in Millstatt" exhibition 2018;
 Complete Worklist 2018 as exhibited at the "Art cycling in Millstatt" exhibition 2018;
 Orcas 2001 on the website of "basis Vienna" (from the solo-exhibition in Innsbruck/AUT 2001;
 Kasbah 2002 from the "All Ceramics" exhibition 2003–2004 by the "Lower Austria Art Association (NÖ-Art)";

1952 births
Living people
20th-century Austrian women artists
21st-century Austrian women artists
Austrian potters
Academic staff of the University of Arts and Industrial Design Linz
Women potters
Austrian women ceramists